Ghassan Elias Rahbani (born May 13, 1964) is a Lebanese producer, lyricist, composer, arranger, orchestra conductor, pianist, and singer. He is a member of the prominent Rahbani family well known for their musical contributions to Lebanese music, including inspiring and nurturing songstress Fairuz, married to Assi Rahbani.

Discography

Studio Albums

Main Singles

References

External links
Official site

1964 births
Living people
Eastern Orthodox Christians from Lebanon
Lebanese composers
Lebanese musicians